There are 75 listed buildings (Swedish: byggnadsminne) in Västerbotten County.

Lycksele Municipality

Nordmaling Municipality

Norsjö Municipality

Robertsfors Municipality

Skellefteå Municipality

Sorsele Municipality

Storuman Municipality

Umeå Municipality
placeholder

Vilhelmina Municipality

Vindeln Municipality

Vännäs Municipality

Åsele Municipality

External links

  Bebyggelseregistret